László Tóth may refer to:

 Laszlo Toth (1938–2012), Hungarian-born Australian geologist who attacked Michelangelo's Pietà 
 László Tóth (footballer) (born 1995), Hungarian footballer
 László Tóth (water polo) (born 1968), Hungarian Olympic footballer
 László Fejes Tóth (1915–2005), Hungarian mathematician
 László Tahi Tóth (1944–2018), Hungarian actor
 László Tóth (racing driver) (born 2000), Hungarian racing driver